Richelieu/Messier Aerodrome  is located  south of the community of Richelieu, Quebec, Canada.

See also
 List of airports in the Montreal area

References

Registered aerodromes in Montérégie
Rouville Regional County Municipality